Tetraopes thermophilus is a species of flat-faced longhorn in the beetle family Cerambycidae. It is found in Central America and North America.

References

Further reading

 
 

Tetraopini
Articles created by Qbugbot
Beetles described in 1861